David Boyle (born 14 February 1961) is a New Zealand cricketer. He played in 69 first-class and 28 List A matches for Canterbury from 1980 to 1995.

See also
 List of Canterbury representative cricketers

References

External links
 

1961 births
Living people
New Zealand cricketers
Canterbury cricketers
Cricketers from Christchurch